Gravitcornutia constricta is a species of moth of the family Tortricidae. It is found in Minas Gerais, Brazil.

The wingspan is 12 mm. The ground colour of the forewings is whitish, slightly tinged with cream grey and dotted grey and brownish. The markings are grey, dotted blackish along edges. The hindwings are brownish cream with greyer strigulation (fine streaks).

Etymology
The species name refers to the constriction of valva.

References

Moths described in 2010
Gravitcornutia
Moths of South America
Taxa named by Józef Razowski